Sonnet 74 is one of 154 sonnets published by the English playwright and poet William Shakespeare in 1609. It is one of the Fair Youth sequence.

Synopsis
This sonnet takes back the urging that occurs in Sonnet 71, that the young man should forget the author. Instead, this sonnet encourages the youth to keep the better part of the poet, which is in his verse, and which will outlive the poet. There is a sense in this poem that the young man is like one who will potentially inherit something of value, and is at the bedside of a dying rich relation, and is considering in a legalistic manner what that value will be – once the dead body has been carried away and dumped in the earth as food for worms. The young man will inherit the best part of the poet – his spirit in the form of this sonnet.

Structure 
Sonnet 74 is an English or Shakespearean sonnet, which contains three quatrains, followed by a final rhyming couplet. It follows the rhyme scheme ABAB CDCD EFEF GG, and is composed in iambic pentameter, a poetic metre in which each line has five feet, and each foot is a pair of weak/strong syllables. The tenth line exemplifies a regular iambic pentameter line:

  ×   /  ×    /     ×  / ×  / ×    / 
The prey of worms, my body being dead; (74.10)
/ = ictus, a metrically strong syllabic position. × = nonictus.

The meter demands a few variant pronunciations: line 4's "memorial" counts as 3 syllables, line 8's "spirit" counts as 1 (possibly pronounced as spear't, sprite, sprit, or spurt), and line 12's "rememberèd" is expanded to 4.

Notes

References

British poems
Sonnets by William Shakespeare